Goldwire is a surname. Notable people with the surname include:

Anthony Goldwire (born 1971), American basketball player and coach
Jordan Goldwire (born 1999), American basketball player
Leemire Goldwire (born 1985), American basketball player